Daybreak is a 1931 American pre-Code drama film directed by Jacques Feyder and written by Cyril Hume and Ruth Cummings. The film stars Ramon Novarro, Helen Chandler, Jean Hersholt, C. Aubrey Smith, William Bakewell and Karen Morley. The film was released on May 2, 1931, by Metro-Goldwyn-Mayer.

Plot
Willi is born into the cream of Vienna society rose in the rank of the elite Royal Imperial Guard to the point where he became a member of its officer corps. Always having friends and relatives in high places to clean up after him after he royally screwed things up Willi has no idea of what being responsible was. With Willi's uncle General Von Hertz, (C. Aubrey Smith), in charge of the military base that he's stationed at, he knew that whatever boners he pulled good old Uncle Hertz would take care of them. One thing Willi didn't expect to happen was to fall in love with someone else, besides himself, and accept the responsibility that goes along with that.

At a party with his officer friends at the Vienna night-spot "Madam Saguss" Willi spots the sweet and lovely young lady Laura Taub, (Helen Chandler), who's a music teacher. Later Willi sees Laura going upstairs to a room with big spender and notorious whore-mister Herr Schnabel, Jean Hersholt. Suspecting that Schnabel was up to no good Willi goes to see if everything is all right only to hear Laura screaming inside the hotel-room as she fights off Schnabel from trying to force himself on her. Willi puts an end to Herr Schnabel's advances by punching him out. Taking the grateful Laura, who at first didn't trust him, on a night on the town Willi spends the next morning at her apartment having breakfast.

After promising to see her again and kissing her good-by Willi innocently leaves a 100 Krone bank note on her dining room table. Helen, who fell in love with Willi, by seeing the note after Willi left now feels insulted by what he did in treating her as if she were just a one-night stand to him or even worse. With Helen letting Willi have it when he came to see her the next day, about what he did to her, left him both hurt and humiliated since he also fell in love with Helen. Willi's action, by leaving the money, was nothing more that a show of appreciation, not a fee for her spending the night with him, which didn't include anything more serious than two or three harmless smooches and getting her a bit tipsy on a couple of glasses of French wine.

Helen goes over the deep end by going back to the sleazy Herr Schnabel and becoming the kind of person that she thinks that Willi thought that she was with her drinking gambling and whoring around. Guilt-ridden by what he did to Helen in turning her into a party animal-type, from the sweet and innocent girl that she was, Willi tries to win her back from Schnabel. Challenging to go head to head with Schnabel in a no holds-bar game of Baccarat Willi feels that would win Helen back to him. In the big showdown Schnabel totally wipes out Willi leaving him 14,000 kroners in debt and a broken and destroyed young man. Being too proud to ask his uncle Gen. Von Hertz for the money and facing disgrace as a member of the Royal Imperial Guard Willi has only one option left open to him: a bullet to the head from his own service revolver.

Cast
Ramon Novarro as Willi
Helen Chandler as Laura
Jean Hersholt as Herr Schnabel
C. Aubrey Smith as General von Hertz
William Bakewell as Otto
Karen Morley as Emily Kessner
Douglass Montgomery as Von Lear 
Glenn Tryon as Franz
Clyde Cook as Josef
Sumner Getchell as Emil
Clara Blandick as Frau Hoffman
Edwin Maxwell as Herr Hoffman
Jackie Searl as August

References

External links 
 

1931 films
1931 drama films
American black-and-white films
American drama films
Films based on works by Arthur Schnitzler
Films directed by Jacques Feyder
Films set in the 1900s
Films set in Austria
Films about gambling
Metro-Goldwyn-Mayer films
Films with screenplays by Cyril Hume
1930s English-language films
1930s American films